General Sir Charles Howard KB (c. 1696 – 26 August 1765), styled The Honourable from birth, was a British soldier and politician.

Background
He was the second son of the 3rd Earl of Carlisle and Lady Anne de Vere Capell, daughter of the 1st Earl of Essex. Howard was a Groom of the Bedchamber from 1714 to 1727 and Member of Parliament (MP) for Carlisle from 1727 to 1761.

Military career
He was commissioned an ensign in the 2nd Regiment of Foot Guards on 10 April 1715. He was promoted to captain of a company of the 16th Regiment of Foot on 10 June 1717. He briefly transferred to Wynne's Dragoons, and on 21 April 1719, returned to the 2nd Foot Guards as captain of a company and lieutenant-colonel in the Army. In 1725, Howard was appointed Lieutenant-Governor of Carlisle and in 1734 colonel and aide-de-camp to King George II of Great Britain. In 1738, he received the command of the 19th Regiment of Foot, which under him became known as The Green Howards. His regiment took part in the War of the Austrian Succession and in 1742, Howard became brigadier-general. He commanded a brigade in the Battle of Dettingen in 1743 and as result was promoted to major-general a week later. He fought in the Battle of Fontenoy in 1745, and commanded the British Infantry in the Battle of Rocoux in 1746. He was made lieutenant-general in the days after the Battle of Val in 1747.

After the war
After the war Howard was transferred to the 3rd Regiment of Dragoon Guards in 1748 and in 1749, created a Knight of the Bath. He was appointed Governor of Fort George and Fort Augustus (Governor of Inverness) for life in 1752 and in 1765, three months before his death, promoted to the rank of general.

He died at Bath, Somerset and is buried in the mausoleum at Castle Howard. Unmarried, his will mentions two illegitimate children:

 William Howard, a captain in Major General Brudenel's Regiment.
 Eleanor Howard, married John Dalrymple of St. James, Westminster, esquire in 1765.

References

1690s births
1765 deaths
British Army generals
British Army personnel of the War of the Austrian Succession
British MPs 1727–1734
British MPs 1734–1741
British MPs 1741–1747
British MPs 1747–1754
British MPs 1754–1761
Green Howards officers
Charles Howard
Knights Companion of the Order of the Bath
Members of the Parliament of Great Britain for Carlisle
Younger sons of earls
3rd Dragoon Guards officers
Coldstream Guards officers
9th Queen's Royal Lancers officers
Bedfordshire and Hertfordshire Regiment officers
Burials in Somerset